Martin Černoch (born 18 November 1977) is a retired Czech football player. He played as a striker.

Honours
Viktoria Plzeň
Czech Second League: 2002–03

References

External links
 
 
 Fan club  
 Profile at iDNES.cz 

1977 births
Living people
Association football forwards
Czech footballers
Czech expatriate footballers
Czech First League players
MFK Vítkovice players
FC Vysočina Jihlava players
FC Viktoria Plzeň players
SK Kladno players
ŠK Futura Humenné players
SK Slavia Prague players
FC Spartak Trnava players
Slovak Super Liga players
Expatriate footballers in Slovakia
FC Politehnica Iași (1945) players
CSM Ceahlăul Piatra Neamț players
Expatriate footballers in Romania
Czech expatriate sportspeople in Romania
Czech expatriate sportspeople in Slovakia
Liga I players
Sportspeople from Nový Jičín